Eupithecia vesiculata is a moth in the family Geometridae. It is found in Madagascar.

References

Moths described in 1954
vesiculata
Moths of Madagascar